= Menahem Noveira =

Italian rabbi and author

Menabem ben Issac Noveira

Personal life
- Born: 1717 Verona, Italy
- Died: 1777 (60 years old)

Religious life
- Religion: Judaism

Jewish leader
- Predecessor: Solomon Bassani
- Successor: Samuel Mortara
- Began: 1757
- Ended: 1777

Menahem ben Issac Noveira (1717–1777), also known as Menaḥem b. Noṿairah or Menahem Navarra, was an Italian physician and poet who was the rabbi of Verona from 1757 until his death in 1777.

== Biography ==
Menahem was born in 1717 in Verona, Italy. He was the third son of Issac Navarra, a scholar, and his wife Grazia. His grandmother, Hezekiah Mordecai Bassani, who was the rabbi of Verona at the time, wanted Menahem to take up her family's traditions, she taught him the bible. In 1734, he married Ester Basevi, the daughter of a notable family. They had eight children: five sons and three daughters. Prior to that, Menahem composed the epitaph for his late father's tombstone. In 1757, Menahem became the rabbi of Verona, retaining that role until he died suddenly during a church sermon in 1777.

== Works ==
- Yeme Temimim (1753)
- Derek Haskel (1756)
- Hanukkat ha-Bayit (1759)
- Penei Yitshak
